Cillian Sheridan (born 23 February 1989) is an Irish professional footballer who plays for Scottish Championship side Dundee.

Sheridan began his career with Celtic in 2006, but a lack of first team opportunities saw him being loaned to other Scottish clubs. In 2010, he switched clubs and countries joining CSKA Sofia of Bulgaria, from where he was loaned to Scottish side St Johnstone in 2011. After playing for Kilmarnock between 2012 and 2013, he signed for defending Cypriot champions APOEL. In both his seasons with the club, he won the double. Subsequently, he moved to rivals Omonia.

He earned three international caps for the Republic of Ireland in 2010.

Club career

Early years
Born in Bailieborough, County Cavan, Sheridan grew up playing Gaelic football for Bailieboro Shamrocks. He began playing the association code with Bailieboro Celtic before travelling to Dublin to play for Belvedere, where he received call-ups for Irish youth squads. During his time at Belvedere, Sheridan chose to focus on his football career, having turned down an offer to join Australian rules club Brisbane Lions. He had trials with several clubs before being offered a contract by Scottish Premier League club Celtic, which he accepted.

Celtic
After joining Celtic in the summer of 2006, Sheridan was promoted to the reserve team and then the first team squad during his first season at the club, a "spectacular rise" according to coach Joe McBride.

He made his first team debut for Celtic in the Scottish Cup quarter-finals against Inverness Caledonian Thistle on 25 February 2007, as a 73rd-minute substitute for Mark Wilson in a 2–1 away victory. He signed a new three-year contract with the club two days later. On 20 May 2007, the final game of the season, he made his league debut against Hibernian, playing the final two minutes of a 2–1 defeat at Easter Road in place of Craig Beattie. Sheridan made his European debut on 21 October 2008, coming on as a substitute for Scott McDonald in Celtic's Champions League game against Manchester United at Old Trafford. He also started in the return game at Celtic Park on 5 November 2008, a 1–1 draw. Just four days after his European debut, Sheridan made his first league start against Hibernian, scoring the second goal of a 4–2 win.

Loan moves

On 2 February 2009 Sheridan signed for Motherwell on loan until the end of the season, to replace Chris Porter, who had signed for Derby County the previous day. He made his debut five days later, coming on as a second-half substitute in a 1–1 draw with St Mirren in the Scottish Cup. He made his first start and league debut a week later on Valentine's Day in Motherwell's 1–0 win over Hamilton, playing the entire 90 minutes as his strike partner David Clarkson scored the only goal of the game. Sheridan scored his first league goal for The Well a fortnight later, the winner in a 2–1 victory at Inverness. His only other goal for Motherwell came near the end of the season in a 3–0 win over Hamilton.

On 13 August 2009, Sheridan joined Plymouth Argyle on a six-month loan deal. He made his debut in a 1–1 draw against Queens Park Rangers. He played 14 times for the Championship team but failed to find the net.

Sheridan completed his loan spell at Plymouth and returned to Celtic on 14 January 2010. Later the same day he was again loaned out, this time to St Johnstone for the rest of the season. On his debut, on 17 February, he scored two goals in a 5–1 win against Hibernian. On 30 March he scored the opening goal for St Johnstone in a 4–1 win over Rangers.

CSKA Sofia
Sheridan signed a three-year contract with Bulgarian club CSKA Sofia on 13 August 2010. Sheridan made his debut in the 2–2 draw against League of Wales side The New Saints; CSKA won 5–2 on aggregate. He scored his first goal for the club in their 3–1 away win against Sliven. On 25 September, Sheridan scored twice in a 2–0 win against Montana. Changes of management, however, made it difficult for Sheridan to settle in Bulgaria.

Trials in the United States and loan to St Johnstone
On 7 June 2011, Sheridan appeared in a reserve match for American side Seattle Sounders FC. Sheridan started the game and scored in the 7th minute of a 2–0 victory over Vancouver Whitecaps FC. Following his spell with Seattle, Sheridan went on trial with their major rivals Portland Timbers, appearing for their reserve team. On 8 July, Sheridan joined SPL club Hibernian on trial, but instead decided to return to St Johnstone on a loan deal until January 2012. He made his second St Johnstone debut on 23 July against Aberdeen, and scored his first two goals of his second stint with the club against Hearts on 25 September. Sheridan scored four goals in 15 appearances before he was prevented from playing by a hamstring injury. In January 2012 St Johnstone and CSKA Sofia agreed to extend the loan deal until the end of the season.

Kilmarnock
After being released by CSKA Sofia, due to the club's financial problems, Sheridan signed a two-year contract with Scottish Premier League side Kilmarnock on 6 September 2012. Sheridan made his debut in a 2–1 loss against Hibernian on 15 September 2012. Seven days later on 22 September 2012, he scored his first goal when he opened the scoring in a 3–1 win over St Mirren. The following week, he scored a hat trick at Tynecastle in 3–1 victory over Hearts. After the match, teammate Manuel Pascali compared Sheridan comparison to former Kilmarnock striker Conor Sammon On 17 October 2012, Sheridan scored against his former club Celtic in a 2–0 win at Parkhead. Sheridan continued his goalscoring form into the second half of the season, but then suffered a hamstring injury which ruled him out for several weeks. During Sheridan's injury absence Kilmarnock signed Kris Boyd, and even after recovering from injury, Sheridan struggled to regain his first team place.

APOEL
On 20 June 2013, Sheridan signed a one-year contract, with the option of a further season with APOEL from Cyprus. He made his official debut on 17 August 2013 against Apollon Limassol in the Cypriot Super Cup final, in a match which APOEL won 1–0 and lifted the trophy. He scored his first official goal for APOEL on 7 December 2013, in his team's 2–0 away win against Ethnikos Achna for the Cypriot First Division. On 8 January 2014, he scored the only goal in APOEL's 1–0 home victory against AEL Limassol for that season's Cypriot Cup. On 5 February 2014, he gave his team the three important points after scoring the winning goal against Anorthosis in APOEL's 2–1 away win. On 29 March 2014, he scored the second goal of the match against Apollon Limassol, in APOEL's 3–0 home win for the Cypriot First Division play-offs. On 21 May 2014, Sheridan scored APOEL's second goal in the Cypriot Cup final against Ermis Aradippou and helped his team to lift the trophy after a 2–0 win. On 31 May 2014, Sheridan gave APOEL their 23rd Cypriot First Division title after scoring the only goal in the title decider match against AEL Limassol.

On 30 July 2014, Sheridan scored the equalizer against HJK Helsinki at Sonera Stadium, in APOEL's 2–2 first leg draw for the third qualifying round of the UEFA Champions League. One week later, he scored again in the return leg against HJK Helsinki, opening the scoring in APOEL's 2–0 home victory and advancement to the play-off round of the 2014–15 UEFA Champions League. On 26 August 2014, he scored the fourth goal in APOEL's 4–0 triumph over Aalborg BK for the UEFA Champions League play-off round, helping his team to reach the group stage of the UEFA Champions League. Sheridan appeared in every group stage match in APOEL's 2014–15 UEFA Champions League campaign. On 25 May 2015, one day after winning his second consecutive double with APOEL, the team announced that Sheridan was leaving the club as his contract would not be renewed.

Omonia
On 10 June 2015, Sheridan signed a contract with rival Cypriot club Omonia. He made his debut on 9 July in the second leg of the Europa League first round qualifying tie against Dinamo Batumi, helping his side to a 2–1 aggregate win. His first goal for his new club came on 23 July in the second leg of the next round qualifying tie against Jagiellonia Białystok, the only goal in a 1–0 win which saw his side qualify for the third qualifying round. He then scored two penalties on 6 August in a 2–2 draw with Brøndby in the Europa League third qualifying round second leg, but his team were eliminated on away goals.

Sheridan played his first league match for Omonia on 22 August 2016 at home against Nea Salamis. He levelled the match at 1–1 after 20 minutes, then helped his side come back from 3–1 down to win 5–3, scoring Omonia's fifth goal from the penalty spot in injury time. Sheridan went on to enjoy the most prolific season of his career to date, scoring a total of 15 goals in the league to add to the three he scored early in the season in the Europa League qualifying rounds.

Jagiellonia Białystok
On 28 February 2017, Sheridan signed a two and half-year contract, with Jagiellonia from Poland.

Wellington Phoenix
In January 2019, Sheridan signed with Wellington Phoenix who play in the Australian A-League until the end of the 2018–19 A-League season.

Ironi Kiryat Shmona
On 5 July 2019, Sheridan signed for the Israeli Premier League club Ironi Kiryat Shmona.

Wisła Płock
On 2 February 2020, Sheridan signed for Ekstraklasa club Wisła Płock.

Dundee 
On 19 July 2021, after a trial period with the club, Sheridan would make his return to Scottish football by signing a two-year deal with Scottish Premiership side Dundee. He would make his debut in a Scottish League Cup win over Forfar Athletic. On 30 October in an away win against St Mirren, Sheridan suffered a ruptured Achilles tendon, which kept him out of action for the remainder of the season.

After playing his first competitive minutes in nearly a full year in an SPFL Reserve League match against Kilmarnock the previous week, Sheridan made his first team return for Dundee in a Scottish Challenge Cup victory away to Welsh champions The New Saints, in which Sheridan would be credited with the opening goal, his first for the Dark Blues. On 8 February 2023, Sheridan would suffer yet more injury heartbreak, as his other Achilles tendon ruptured during a Challenge Cup game against Raith Rovers.

International career
Sheridan has been capped for the Republic of Ireland national under-17 football team, scoring in the 2005 Nordic Under-17 Football Championship win over England.

He also line up for the Republic of Ireland under-21, making his debut for the team, in a friendly match, against Germany U21. He appeared in the 2011 UEFA U–21 qualifiers. He scored his first goal in the seventh minute of a match against Estonia U21, on the virtue of which, the match ended in a draw. He went on to play a total of 10 times for the side, finding the net twice.

On 25 May 2010, Sheridan won his first cap for the Republic of Ireland in a 2–1 friendly win against Paraguay at the RDS Arena, as a 62nd-minute substitute for Robbie Keane. Three days later, he featured as a 72nd-minute substitute for Kevin Doyle as the Irish defeated Algeria 3–0 at the same ground. His final of three caps was his only start, playing 56 minutes of a 1–0 defeat to Argentina at the Aviva Stadium on 11 August before being withdrawn for Andy Keogh.

Career statistics

Honours
Republic of Ireland U17
Nordic Under-17 Football Championship: 2005CSKA Sofia Bulgarian Cup: 2010–11APOEL'''
 Cypriot First Division: 2013–14, 2014–15
 Cypriot Cup: 2013–14, 2014–15
 Cypriot Super Cup: 2013

References

External links

 
 APOEL official profile
 
 
 
 Cillian Sheridan Interview

1989 births
Living people
Sportspeople from County Cavan
Bailieboro Shamrocks Gaelic footballers
Gaelic footballers who switched code
Republic of Ireland association footballers
Association football forwards
Belvedere F.C. players
Celtic F.C. players
Motherwell F.C. players
Plymouth Argyle F.C. players
St Johnstone F.C. players
PFC CSKA Sofia players
Kilmarnock F.C. players
APOEL FC players
AC Omonia players
Jagiellonia Białystok players
Wellington Phoenix FC players
Hapoel Ironi Kiryat Shmona F.C. players
Wisła Płock players
Scottish Premier League players
English Football League players
First Professional Football League (Bulgaria) players
Cypriot First Division players
Ekstraklasa players
Israeli Premier League players
Republic of Ireland youth international footballers
Republic of Ireland under-21 international footballers
Republic of Ireland international footballers
Republic of Ireland expatriate association footballers
Expatriate footballers in Scotland
Expatriate footballers in Bulgaria
Expatriate footballers in Cyprus
Expatriate footballers in Poland
Expatriate footballers in Israel
Irish expatriate sportspeople in Scotland
Irish expatriate sportspeople in Bulgaria
Irish expatriate sportspeople in Cyprus
Irish expatriate sportspeople in Poland
Alumni of the University of Strathclyde
Dundee F.C. players